= Accelerated Access Review =

UK organization for NHS patients

The Accelerated Access Review was an initiative commissioned by the government of the United Kingdom, working with the Department of Health. The Accelerated Access Review aimed to speed up access to innovative drugs, devices and diagnostics for NHS patients. The Accelerated Access Review was commissioned by the government in November 2014, and produced its final report in October 2016.
